South Carolina is a state in the United States.

South Carolina may also refer to:

Schools
 University of South Carolina, a public university in South Carolina
 South Carolina Gamecocks, the school's athletic program

Ships
 Indien (1780) or South Carolina, a frigate of the South Carolina Navy
 USS South Carolina (1860), a screw steamer
 USS South Carolina (BB-26), a battleship launched in 1908
 South Carolina-class battleship, a class of US Navy battleship
 USS South Carolina (CGN-37), a California-class cruiser built in 1972

Territories
 Province of South Carolina, during the colonial era
 Republic of South Carolina, during the U.S. Civil War

See also
 USS South Carolina, a list of ships of the United States Navy